Geranium californicum is a species of Geranium known by the common name California cranesbill. It is endemic to California, where it grows in the Sierra Nevada and coastal ranges in the southern part of the state.

Description
This is a perennial herb topping half a meter in maximum height. Its thin, hairy stems have many wide, palmate leaves divided into several segments which are subdivided into small lobes. Flowers appear singly or in pairs on small stalks. Each has five pointed sepals beneath five rounded to oval-shaped petals which may have slight notches in the ends. The petals are up to 1.5 centimeters long and white to pale pink or lavender with deeper lavender veining.

External links
Jepson Manual Treatment of Geranium californicum
Geranium californicum - UC Photos gallery

californicum
Endemic flora of California
Flora of the Sierra Nevada (United States)
Natural history of the Peninsular Ranges
Natural history of the Transverse Ranges
Flora without expected TNC conservation status